The 2008–09 season was the Manitoba Junior Hockey League's (MJHL) 92nd season of operation.

Season highlights
The MJHL adopted the crossover format for the playoffs.  In this format the top 8 teams make it to the playoffs regardless of the division.

Standings

Playoffs

Post MJHL playoffs
Anavet Cup
Portage Terriers defeated by the Humboldt Broncos from the SJHL.

External links
 MJHL Website

Manitoba Junior Hockey League seasons
MJHL